The One was a video game magazine in the United Kingdom which covered 16-bit home gaming during the late 1980s and early 1990s. It was first published by EMAP in October 1988 and initially covered computer games aimed at the Atari ST, Amiga, and IBM PC compatible markets.

Like many similar magazines, it contained sections of news, game reviews, previews, tips, help guides, columnist writings, readers' letters, and cover-mounted disks of game demos.

The magazine was sometimes criticised for including "filler" content such as articles on Arnold Schwarzenegger with the justification that an upcoming film had a computer game tie-in.

Readers also initially had trouble buying the magazine due to the name; The One lead to confusion among newsagents over exactly which magazine they meant.

History
In 1988 the 16-bit computer scene was beginning to emerge. With Commodore's Amiga and Atari's ST starting to gain more and more coverage in the multi format titles, EMAP decided it was time for a dedicated magazine aimed at the user of these 16-bit computers. The One for 16-Bit Games was launched and covered the Atari ST, Amiga, and PC games market. Produced by editor Gary Penn and a small team of contributors, the magazine went on to gain a circulation figures of over 40,000 readers.

The industry voted The One for 16-Bit Games "Magazine of the Year" in February 1990.

In June 1990, the magazine was extensively redesigned. Some regular features were dropped, the layout was changed, and the logo changed slightly to more emphasize ONE. The magazine was subtitled "For Amiga, Atari ST and PC Games".

Splits and reorganisation 

The ST and Amiga had reached a larger market by 1991 and there were dozens of single format magazines catering to these users. Because of this EMAP, along with recently appointed editor Ciarán Brennan, made the decision to split the magazine into The One for Amiga Games starting May 1991 and The One for ST Games. PC games coverage was transferred to the recently launched PC Leisure.

1991 was the start of the high-water mark of 16-bit gaming. The 8-bit computers were fading away and gamers were moving over to the faster and more powerful 16-bit formats. Because many features fell into the general computing category, content remained similar between the two magazines. Because both magazines were produced by the same production team, the magazines resembled one another. However a few months later both titles would move in their own directions, catering for platform specific games.
             
In 1992 EMAP was reorganizing their games magazines. Mean Machines was split into two, The One for ST Games was incorporated into Europress's ST Action, and ACE magazine closed. ACE magazine closing meant that there was a well-respected team available. To give The One a new direction and look, the original staff were moved on (speculation suggests they were moved to assist with the launch of ST Review magazine) and the ACE writers took their place. The change of The One was evident with magazines' relaunch.  The new editor Jim Douglas and his team produced the new magazine from May 1992, with its shortened logo THE ONE, with the subtitle "Incorporating all the best of ACE". As the subtitle suggested, the magazine layout and content was essentially The One with some of the content of ACE, together producing an entirely new magazine.

Just months after the redesign, most of the staff moved on and David Upchurch took over editorship.  Again, the magazine put the word "Amiga" in its title starting October 1992. Now called The One Amiga, this would allow potential readers to recognise the magazine as an Amiga title. The staples were also replaced in favour of a spine bound magazine. 
     
There were many significant changes to the Amiga market in 1993. More coverage was given to games that were A1200 specific and there was the launch of the 32-bit Amiga CD32. All formats were accommodated within the magazine by way of the details box which indicated what specification the game was designed for.

In March 1994, David Upchurch announced his departure in that issue. Deputy Editor, Simon Byron, stepped up to replace him. Just eight issues later and the cycle repeated itself, Simon Byron left, and Deputy Editor, Andy Nuttall replaced him. Despite the new editorship and optimism the magazine page count decreased to 84 - partially as a result of Commodore going into liquidation, making the Amiga market uncertain of what would happen next.

In July 1995 it was announced that EMAP was closing the magazine down. The One content was incorporated into EMAP's other Amiga title, CU Amiga, beginning in the August 1995 edition of the latter.

This was not the end of the original The One magazine however, as Maverick Magazines bought the title and launched their first edition in August 1995. This version, dubbed The One Amiga: Maverick Edition, had a different content. It looked like The One but it lacked the former writing style and spirit of the EMAP team. Beginning in early 1996, the magazine quickly decreased to a pamphlet style magazine of just 16 pages - mostly dedicated to the full game included on the coverdisk - before ending with the final issue of August 1996. Unlike previously, this time around no mention was made of the fact that the magazine was ceasing publication.

References

External links

 The Many Faces of The One - Amiga History Guide
 The One Magazine Issue Archive

Amiga magazines
Atari ST magazines
Defunct computer magazines published in the United Kingdom
Home computer magazines
Magazines established in 1988
Magazines disestablished in 1996
Mass media in Peterborough
Video game magazines published in the United Kingdom